Marymount Academy is a middle and high school in Greater Sudbury, Ontario, which offers Catholic education for girls in Grades 7 through 12. The school serves between 400 and 600 students. 

The school originally opened in 1956 as Marymount College, a girls' high school founded by the Sisters of St. Joseph, equivalent to the boys-only St. Charles College. Following St. Charles' conversion to a co-educational school in 1993, enrolment at Marymount began to decline, a process that accelerated following the opening of St. Benedict Catholic Secondary School in 1996. The school thus added Grade 7 and 8 education, and developed a special focus on enriched academic education for young women, changing its name to the current Marymount Academy.

Marymount Academy's motto is 'Disce ut Vivas', which is the Latin version of 'Learn That You May Live'. The school's official colours are navy blue and burgundy. Students wear uniforms, generally a kilt and a top in school colours. 

The school is located at 165 D'Youville Avenue near the city's downtown core, a facility shared with the head office of the Sudbury Catholic District School Board. Marymount is heavily involved in fundraising for the Sudbury community, and participates and initiates events such as canned food drives, pep rallies, and charity benefits. Several times each year, students and faculty attend mass at Christ The King Church, their parish. 

Marymount offers a wide variety of extracurricular activities. These include councils (Student Administrative Council, Girls Athletic Association, Marymount Catholic Charities Council), athletics (volleyball, soccer, basketball, flag football, track and field) and clubs (choir, band, Italian Club, Big Sister Little Sister, Ontario Students Against Impaired Driving, French Club, Chess Club, and Creative Writing Club). Marymount Academy is a dominant force in Sudbury's school athletics community. Since 1991, Marymount has earned 19 Northern Ontario Secondary School Athletics Championship titles in volleyball. 

In 2009, The Fraser Institute, an independent research and education organization, ranked Marymount as the fourth best elementary/highschool in the province. Marymount ranked a 9.8 out of 10, based on standardized test results and other factors.

See also
List of high schools in Ontario

External links
 Marymount Academy

Catholic secondary schools in Ontario
High schools in Greater Sudbury
1956 establishments in Ontario
Educational institutions established in 1956
Girls' schools in Canada